Euskadi–Murias was a Spanish UCI Professional Continental cycling team, that competed between 2015 and 2019. It was initially UCI Continental status, but upgraded to Pro Continental in 2018. Its sponsor was the Basque construction company Murias Group.

Final team roster

Major wins
2016
Stage 1 Volta ao Alentejo, Imanol Estévez

2018
Stage 1 Vuelta Aragon, Jon Aberasturi
Stage 3 Vuelta Aragon, Mikel Bizkarra
 Overall Tour of Norway, Eduard Prades
Stage 2 Troféu Joaquim Agostinho, Cyril Barthe
Stage 13 Vuelta a España, Óscar Rodríguez
 Overall Tour of Turkey, Eduard Prades

2019
Stages 1, 2 & 6 Volta ao Alentejo, Enrique Sanz
Stage 3 Vuelta a Castilla y León, Enrique Sanz
Stage 1 Troféu Joaquim Agostinho, Enrique Sanz
Stage 2 Volta a Portugal, Mikel Aristi
Stage 6 Volta a Portugal, Héctor Sáez
Stage 2 Tour du Limousin, Mikel Aristi
Stage 11 Vuelta a España, Mikel Iturria

References

External links

UCI Professional Continental teams
Cycling teams based in Spain
Cycling teams established in 2015
2015 establishments in the Basque Country (autonomous community)
Cycling teams disestablished in 2019
Cycle racing in the Basque Country (autonomous community)